Helmuth Markov (born 5 June 1952) is a German politician.

Life and education 
Born in Leipzig, Markov is the son of the German Marxist historian Walter Markov. From 1970 to 1976, he studied engineering at the Kiev Polytechnic Institute, where he got his graduation in engineering in 1976. In 1984, he became Doctor of Engineering.

He is married and has three children.

Politics 
In 1973, Markov became a member of the SED and was from 1993 to 1995 Regional Chairman of the PDS in Brandenburg.

From 1990 until 1999, he was a Member of Brandenburg's Regional Assembly.

After the European elections in 1999, he became a Member of the European Parliament with the Party of Democratic Socialism (PDS). He was treasurer of the European United Left - Nordic Green Left and sat on the European Parliament's Committee on International Trade.
He was a substitute for the Committee on Transport and Tourism and a member of the Delegation to the EU-Ukraine Parliamentary Cooperation Committee.

From 2009 till 5 November 2014, Markov was the Minister of Finance and Deputy Prime Minister of Brandenburg, he was also the Minister of Justice, Consumer Protection and European Affairs of Brandenburg from 21 January 2014 till 22 April 2016.

External links

 Profile at the EP group
 
 

1952 births
Living people
Ministers of the Brandenburg State Government
MEPs for Germany 1999–2004
MEPs for Germany 2004–2009